Arctiocossus is a genus of moths in the family Cossidae.

Species
 Arctiocossus antargyreus C. Felder & R. Felder, 1874
 Arctiocossus castaneus (Gaede, 1929)
 Arctiocossus danieli Clench, 1959
 Arctiocossus gaerdesi (Daniel, 1956)
 Arctiocossus impeditus (Walker, 1865)
 Arctiocossus ligatus (Walker, 1865)
 Arctiocossus poliopterus Clench, 1959
 Arctiocossus punctifera Gaede, 1929
 Arctiocossus strigulatus Gaede, 1929
 Arctiocossus tessellatus Clench, 1959

Former species
 Arctiocossus aries Püngeler, 1902

References

 , 1959: Notes on African Cossidae. Veröffentlichungen der Zoologischen Staatssammlung München, 6: 3-27. Full article: .
 , 1990: A Phylogenetic study on Cossidae (Lepidoptera: Ditrysia) based on external adult morphology. Zoologische Verhandelingen 263: 1-295. Full article: .

External links
Natural History Museum Lepidoptera generic names catalog

Cossinae
Moth genera